Velfrey may refer to the following places in Wales:

Lampeter Velfrey
Llanddewi Velfrey